Jungwon Air Base  (sometimes K-75 Air Base or Choongwon Air Base) is located near Chungju, North Chungcheong Province, South Korea.

Units stationed

The base is home to the RoKAF 19th Fighter Wing (제19전투비행단), comprising:
 161st Fighter Squadron flying F-16C/D (Block 32)
 162nd Fighter Squadron flying F-16C/D (Block 32)
 155th Fighter Squadron flying KF-16C/D (Block 52)
 159th Fighter Squadron flying KF-16C/D (Block 52)

Accidents and incidents
30 June 2003, F-16 made a hard landing, the pilot ejected successfully.
27 January 2006, F-16C #85-1576 crashed shortly after takeoff, the pilot ejected successfully.

References

External links

South Korean airbases